

Squad

Matches

Veikkausliiga

UEFA Europa League

Qualifying Phase

References

2009
Honka